The 1952 NCAA Track and Field Championships were contested at the 31st annual NCAA-hosted track meet to determine the team and individual national champions of men's collegiate track and field events in the United States. This year's meet was hosted by the University of California at Edwards Stadium in Berkeley.

USC won their fourth consecutive team national championship, netting the 16th team title in program history.

Team Result 
 Note: Top 10 only
 (H) = Hosts

See also 
 NCAA Men's Outdoor Track and Field Championship
 NAIA Men's Outdoor Track and Field Championship − first edition held in 1952
 1951 NCAA Men's Cross Country Championships

References

NCAA Men's Outdoor Track and Field Championship
NCAA Track and Field
NCAA
NCAA Track and Field Championships